Marie-Angélique Savané (née Sagna, born 2 November 1947) is a Senegalese sociologist and feminist activist, who has been "an extremely vocal proponent of legal and social reforms in Senegalese society on behalf of women", according to the Dictionary of African Biography. She has been called one of the pioneers of feminism in Africa.

Early life
She was born on 2 November 1947 in Dakar, Senegal, into a Catholic family.

Career
From 1974 to 1978, Savané was Editor-in-Chief of the magazine Famille et Développement (Family and Development), "sub-Saharan Africa's self-help magazine". During her time in charge, she moved the magazine from a Western to an African viewpoint, "helping Africans help themselves".

Savané has worked for the United Nations, and as a consultant to various UN organisations for many years.

Savané is a co-founder of the Association of African Women for Research.

Personal life
She is married to Landing Savané (born 1945) a left-wing Senegalese politician, and the Secretary-General of And-Jëf/African Party for Democracy and Socialism.

They are the parents of the professional basketball player Sitapha Savané.

References

1947 births
Living people
Senegalese feminists
People from Dakar
Senegalese sociologists
Senegalese women sociologists